The 2022–23 KK Crvena zvezda season is the 78th season in the existence of the club. For the season it is referred to as Crvena zvezda mts until 31 December 2022 and later on as Crvena zvezda Meridianbet for sponsorship reasons. The club is a two-time triple crown (ABA League, Serbian League, and Serbian Cup) defending champion.

Overview

Pre-season

Reportedly, Crvena zvezda expressed their interest to sign guards Lorenzo Brown, Shabazz Napier, Isaiah Taylor, Justin Cobbs, Pierriá Henry, Nemanja Nedović (ultimately signed on 7 July), Miloš Teodosić, Vladimir Mihailović, forwards Kostas Antetokounmpo, Dalibor Ilić (ultimately signed on 14 July), Nemanja Bjelica, and centers Miroslav Raduljica (ultimately signed on 28 September), Hassan Martin (ultimately signed on 9 July), Zoran Nikolić, Chris Singleton, and Boban Marjanović, among other free agents in the off-season.

On 21 June 2022, German center Maik Zirbes announced that he will be leaving the club as a free agent. This was his second spell at the club. On 26 June, Serbian international forward Dejan Davidovac left the club after his contract expired and joined Russian powerhouse CSKA Moscow. He spent five seasons with the Crvena zvezda winning three Adriatic leagues, four Serbian leagues, one Adriatic supercup and two Serbian cups. On 27 June, American guard Austin Hollins left the club after his contract expired and joined Israeli powerhouse Maccabi Tel Aviv.

On 30 June, the club parted ways with head coach Dejan Radonjić who agreed on a two-years deal with Greek club Panathinaikos after his contract with Crvena zvezda expired. This ended his second spell at the club which made him one of the most successful coaches in Crvena zvezda's history with 5 Serbian leagues, 5 Adriatic leagues and 5 Serbian cups and also a coach with most games coached in club's history. Reportedly, the club expressed their interest to sign head coaches Ioannis Sfairopoulos, Zoran Lukić, and Pablo Laso among others, following departure of Radonjić. Coach Laso declined the offer due to health issues.

On 7 July, the club brought in the first signing for upcoming season - Serbian international guard Nemanja Nedović and Olympics silver medalist from 2016 signed a three-years deal with the club after his contract with Greek side Panathinaikos expired. This will be his second spell with the Crvena zvezda, for whom he previously played between 2008 and 2012.

On 8 July, the club announced Vladimir Jovanović as their new head coach. Jovanović, who previously coached FMP and Cibona and is a current head coach of Serbia men's national under-20 basketball team, signed a three-years contract. On the same day, a club's veteran Marko Simonović announced his retirement as an active player and was instead hired as a new assistant coach. This ended his third spell with the club during which he won 13 titles in total.

Crvena zvezda announced that they have signed two-years-long contract with American center Hassan Martin who previously played for Greek powerhouse Olympiacos on 9 July. Three days later, on 12 July, they have signed a year-long contract with Puerto Rican swingman John Holland who previously played for Turkish side Frutti Extra Bursaspor. On 12 July, a Serbian forward Nikola Kalinić, who was Adriatic League regular season MVP and member of the Ideal Starting Five, left the club to join Spanish side FC Barcelona. This was his second spell with the club with whom he won 6 titles in total. On the other side, a team captain Branko Lazić signed a two-year contract extension on 13 July. On 14 July 2022, the club signed Bosnian-born and Serbia international forward Dalibor Ilić on a four-year contract. On 19 July 2022, the club signed their former youth system player and the 2022 EuroLeague champion center Filip Petrušev. On the next day, 20 July, club signed Ghanaian power forward Ben Bentil who spent previous season playing for Italian side Olimpia Milano. The seventh new player arrived on 29 July, when the club signed American point guard Jaylen Adams who arrived from NBL champions Sydney Kings.

On 26 August 2022, the team started with a training camp. The first roll call included guards Nikola Ivanović, Stefan Marković, Adams, Nikola Topić, and Holland, forwards Stefan Lazarević, Lazić, Ilić, Luka Mitrović, Lazar Gačić, Bentil, and Nemanja Popović, and centers Ognjen Kuzmić and Martin, as well as two promotions from their youth system, Filip Radaković (signed in June 2022) and Lazar Đoković (signed in April 2022). Players Ognjen Dobrić, Nedović, and Petrušev were with the Serbia EuroBasket team, while Aaron White will join later due to family obligations. Subsequently, Dobrić and Petrušev were cut from the 12-man roster, making Nedović the only player who played at EuroBasket 2022 and club decided to terminate contract with Aaron White.

Last signing during the pre-season was former Serbian international center and silver medalist from EuroBasket, World Cup and the Olympics Miroslav Raduljica who arrived at the club on 28 September and signed two-years-long contract. He signed as a free agent, having previously played for South Korean side Goyang Carrot Jumpers until he was waived in December 2021.

October 
Club had a strong start in Adriatic league, winning its first 4 games of the season and ending the month on the fourth place in the league. On the other hand, in Euroleague, club won only one of the first five matches ending the month in 16th place.

On 14 October, club announced new signing - Argentine guard Luca Vildoza who previously played for Milwaukee Bucks. He signed two-years-long contract until 2024. At the end of the month he received ABA League Player of the Month Award.

November 
In Adriatic League club played three more games, winning two of them and suffering first loss of the season in a home game against Zadar. This secured them third place in the league at the end of the month. While in Euroleague club played five more games, and won three of them, which brought them up to the 14th place at the end of the month. 
 
On 3 November, just three months after arriving, the club parted ways with American point guard Jaylen Adams, who played only five games.

On 13 November, head coach Jovanović parted ways with the club. On the next day, the club hired Montenegrin coach Duško Ivanović as their new head coach. On 19 November, the club parted ways with Jovanović's assistant coaches Marko Simonović, Branko Jorović, and Miodrag Dinić following a hire of new head coach. On the next day, they have hired Spanish coach Carles Marco as new assistant coach.

December 
During this month in Adriatic league club played and won four more games extending their winning run to six games. This secured them second place in the regular season at the end of December. In Euroleague club played six games, winning four and losing two of them. With these four wins club managed to climb to the tenth place of the regular season table at the end of the month. Argentinian guard Luca Vildoza was named EuroLeague MVP of the Month for this month. This was the second time that player from Crvena zvezda received this award, with the first one being Ognjen Kuzmić during the 2016–17 season

In early December, Crvena zvezda expressed their interest to sign Argentine NBA guard Facundo Campazzo, following his release from the Dallas Mavericks. Ultimately, he signed on 19 December for the club.

On 18 December, in a pre-game warm-up against Mega MIS, all Zvezda's players wore a t-shirt with a picture of Siniša Mihajlović with a title 'Legends Live Forever!', honoring him following his recent death. Mihajlović was a Crvena zvezda football player in the early 1990s.

By the end of December, the club expressed their interest to sign Italian power forward Achille Polonara.

January 
Club managed to continue their good form in Adriatic league during the January, winning all five of games played and extending their unbeaten run to eleven games. This kept them on the second place of the table at the end of the month, with one game behind leading Partizan. Good form from the Adriatic league didn't extend to Euroleague this month. Zvezda played six games, winning two and losing four of them including derby against their rivals Partizan. This brought them down to 13th place on regular season table.

In EuroLeague, Filip Petrušev received MVP of the Round award for his 36 PIR in round 17th win against Valencia Basket.

On 4 January 2023, Euroleague Basketball's Finance Panel imposed sanction consisting of a prohibition to register new players and coaches until February 28, 2023, and a fine of €25,000 on the club for violations of the Financial Stability & Fair Play Regulations. This prohibition also applied to Facundo Campazzo who was previously signed by the club on 19 December 2022.

On 9 January 2023, the ABA League declined and cancelled a transfer of young guard Nikola Topić to FMP Meridian. Eventually, he moved to OKK Beograd.

February 
On 14 February 2023, head coach Ivanović announced the 12-man roster for upcoming Radivoj Korać Cup in Niš, excluded guard Ivanović, forwards Ilić and Holland, and center Raduljica from the season roster.

Players

Current roster

Players with multiple nationalities
   Ben Bentil
   John Holland
   Dalibor Ilić
   Ognjen Kuzmić
   Luca Vildoza

Depth chart

On loan
The following players have been on loan during the 2022–23 season and have professional contracts signed with the club.

Under contract, not assigned
The following players are under a professional contract with the club
 Nemanja Popović
 Marko Gušić

Transactions

Players In

|}

Players Out

|}

Club

Technical Staff 

On 8 July 2022, Crvena zvezda hired Vladimir Jovanović as their new head coach. The club also added a 2021–22 club's roster member Marko Simonović to the coaching staff as an assistant coach. Assistant coaches Goran Bošković, Nikola Birač, Saša Kosović, and Aleksandar Lukman (conditioning coach) left the coaching staff following the change of the head coach. On 9 July, the club added Branko Jorović to the Jovanović's coaching staff. In July 2022, the club added Vladan Radonjić as their new strength and conditioning coach.

On 13 November 2022, head coach Jovanović parted ways with the club. On the next day, the club hired Montenegrin coach Duško Ivanović as their new head coach. On 19 November, the club parted ways with Jovanović's assistant coaches Marko Simonović, Branko Jorović, and Miodrag Dinić following a hire of new head coach. On the next day, they have hired Spanish coach Carles Marco as new assistant coach.

The following is the technical staff of Crvena zvezda for the 2022–23 season.

Uniform
Crvena zvezda unveiled their new Adidas uniforms for the 2022–23 season on 26 September 2020, on the EuroLeague Media Day.

The following is a list of corporate sponsorship patches on a uniform of Crvena zvezda and uniform designs for the 2022–23 season.

Supplier: Adidas
Main sponsors: Meridian, mts
Left shoulder sponsor: Dunav osiguranje
Back sponsors: Soccerbet (above number), Idea (bellow number)
Shorts sponsor (right leg):  Carnex (big), Banka Poštanska štedionica (small)

Pre-season and friendlies 
Crvena zvezda is scheduled to play seven pre-season games. The first two games were played in Belgrade. Then, they were participated at a tournament in Antalya, Turkey, from 14 to 18 September 2022. Furthermore, the team is scheduled to play at the 2022 Neofytos Chandriotis Basketball Tournament (NCBT) together with Peristeri, Olympiacos, and Hapoel Holon in Nicosia, Cyprus, from 23 to 24 September 2022.

Competitions

Overall

Overview

Adriatic League

Regular season

Results summary

Results by round

Matches
Note: All times are CET (UTC+1). The club changed its sponsoring name on 1 January 2023.

EuroLeague

Regular season

Results summary

Results by round

Matches
Note: All times are CET (UTC+1) as listed by EuroLeague. The club changed its sponsoring name on 1 January 2023.

Radivoj Korać Cup 

The 2023 Radivoj Korać Cup is the 21th season of the Serbian men's national basketball cup tournament. The Zvezda is the two-time defending champion.

Individual awards

EuroLeague

ABA League

Statistics

Adriatic League

Euroleague

Radivoj Korać Cup

Head coaches records 

Last updated:

See also 
2022–23 Red Star Belgrade season

Notes

References

External links
 KK Crvena zvezda official website
 Crvena zvezda at the Adriatic League 
 Crvena zvezda at the EuroLeague

KK Crvena Zvezda seasons
Crvena zvezda
Crvena zvezda
Crvena zvezda